Live Code is a live album by the industrial band Front 242. It was released in 1994. The album is also known as Live Code 6007042 02528 in North America or Live Code 5413356 424225 in Europe, depending on the UPC-EAN. It would later contrast the band's 1998 experimental live album Re-Boot: Live '98.

Production
The album was recorded live for VPRO Radio 3 on October 25, 1993 at MC Vredenburg, Utrecht, Netherlands. The live-recording was produced by Flip van der Enden and engineered by Herman Geerling. The album was mastered by Bob Ludwig.

Reception
The album peaked at #68 on the CMJ Radio Top 200 in the U.S.

Track listing

All tracks published by Les Editions Confidentielles.

References

Front 242 albums
1994 live albums